Volodymyr Serhiyovych Hrachov (born 24 December 1997) is a Ukrainian football defender who plays for Kramatorsk.

Club career
In 2014–15 UEFA Youth League, he represented FC Shakhtar Donetsk Under-19 squad that reached the final.

He made his debut in the Russian Football National League for FC Veles Moscow on 9 October 2020 in a game against FC Yenisey Krasnoyarsk.

References

External links
 Profile at the Official UAF website
 Profile by Russian Football National League
 

1997 births
People from Avdiivka
Living people
Ukrainian footballers
Ukraine youth international footballers
Ukraine under-21 international footballers
Association football defenders
FC Shakhtar Donetsk players
FC Veles Moscow players
FC Kramatorsk players
Ukrainian expatriate footballers
Ukrainian expatriate sportspeople in Cyprus
Ukrainian expatriate sportspeople in Russia
Expatriate footballers in Cyprus
Expatriate footballers in Russia
Cypriot Second Division players
Russian First League players
Ukrainian First League players
Sportspeople from Donetsk Oblast